Microtis brownii, commonly known as the sweet mignonette orchid or sweet onion orchid, is a species of orchid endemic to the south-west of Western Australia. It has a single hollow, onion-like leaf and up to sixty small, green and white scented flowers well-spaced along the flowering stem. It usually grows in swampy places, flowers more prolifically after summer fires and sometimes forms very large colonies.

Description 
Flowering occurs from November to January but more prolifically after fire the previous summer.

Taxonomy and naming
Microtis brownii was first formally described in 1871 by Heinrich Gustav Reichenbach and the description was published in Beitrage zur Systematischen Pflanzenkunde. The specific epithet (brownii) honours the Scottish botanist Robert Brown.

Distribution and habitat
The sweet mignonette orchid usually grows in swampy places but sometimes in woodland, forest or inland granite outcrops. It sometimes forms colonies of thousands of plants and is widespread and common, especially between Perth and Esperance.

Conservation
Microtis brownii is classified as "not threatened" by the Western Australian Government Department of Parks and Wildlife.

References

External links
 

brownii
Endemic orchids of Australia
Orchids of Western Australia
Plants described in 1871